The following is a list of governors of Homs Governorate, since 1921.

List of officeholders (1921–present)

See also 

 Homs
 History of Homs
 Timeline of Homs
 List of governors of Damascus
 List of governors of Aleppo

References

External links 

 List of Governors of Homs; (in Arabic)

Homs
Homs Governorate
History of Homs Governorate